LDAP Account Manager is a web application for managing various account types in an LDAP directory. It is written in PHP. In contrast to tools like PhpLDAPadmin the focus is account based and to give the user a more abstract view of a directory. This aims to allow people with little technical background to manage LDAP data.  The base application is licensed under the GNU General Public License, and there is an extended version available under a commercial license.

History 
The LDAP Account Manager (LAM) project was founded in February 2003. The first developers were Michael Dürgner, Roland Gruber, Tilo Lutz and Leonhard Walchshäusl. The goal was to create an application to manage Samba software accounts. At this time Samba supported LDAP in its 2.x releases and version 3 was at alpha stage. But there was no GUI to manage them.
Until LAM version 0.4.10 only Samba accounts could be managed. In the year 2004 the project started to develop a plugin architecture to support more account types. The first stable release with the new code was LAM 0.5.0 in September 2005.
There is a commercial variant (LAM Pro) since 1.0.4 that supports a user self-service (e.g. to change own password, telephone number, ...). It also supports additional LDAP objects (e.g. Zarafa, Kerberos, PPolicy, ...).

Features 
The most important account types which are supported by LAM are Samba, Unix, Zarafa and PPolicy. The user can define profiles for all account types to set default values. Account information can be exported as PDF files. There is also the possibility to create users via file upload.
It also includes the tree view of PhpLDAPadmin to access the raw LDAP attributes.
LAM is translated to 16 languages.

Supported account types:
 Unix
 Samba 3,4
 Kolab
 Address book entries
 Asterisk (incl. voicemail and Asterisk extensions)
 Mail routing
 IMAP mailboxes (non-LDAP, via IMAP protocol)
 Hosts
 FreeRadius
 Authorized services
 SSH keys
 File system quota (in LDAP (systemQuotas) and via external script)
 DHCP entries
 NIS netgroups

The commercial version also includes a user self-service. This allows users to edit their own data, register accounts or reset passwords themselves.

Related software 
Samba software
Kolab

See also 
 List of LDAP software

External links 

2003 software
Database administration tools
Free software programmed in PHP